Martin Puchner is a literary critic and philosopher. He studied at Konstanz University, the University of Bologna, and the University of California, Santa Barbara, before receiving his Ph.D. at Harvard University. Until 2009 he held the H. Gordon Garbedian Chair at Columbia University, where he also served as co-chair of the Theater Ph.D. program. He now holds the Byron and Anita Wien Chair of Drama and of English and Comparative Literature at Harvard University. He is the founding director of the Mellon School of Theater and Performance Research at Harvard University.

As a literary critic, he focuses on modernism, especially such genres as the closet drama, the literary manifesto, and modern drama. His philosophical work concerns the philosophical dialogue and the intersections of theater and philosophy.

In an interview with Rain Taxi, Puchner anticipates the avant-garde in the 21st century in its relation to media, asserting “We are going through a media revolution even more extreme than that of the 20th century. I would say that an avant-garde for the 21st century would have to develop ways of using our own new media in critical, innovative, provocative ways. It would also have to be part of a political analysis of our moment, and translate that analysis into a new set of attitudes and ambitions.”

He is the general editor of the Norton Anthology of World Literature and lectures on world literature.

In 2016 he launched a HarvardX MOOC on World Literature.

In 2017, he won a Guggenheim Fellowship. He currently is a Cullman Fellow at the New York Public Library.

In 2017, he published a sweeping account of literature from the invention of writing to the Internet: The Written World: The Power of Stories to Shape People, History, Civilization. New York: Random House, 2017.
The book won advanced praise from Margaret Atwood.

On October 13, 2020, W. W. Norton & Company will publish his latest book, The Language of Thieves: My Family's Obsession with a Secret Code the Nazis Tried to Eliminate.

Bibliography
2002; 2011: Stage Fright: Modernism, Anti-theatricality and Drama. Baltimore: Johns Hopkins University Press.
2003: Against Theatre: Creative Destructions on the Modernist Stage. Editor, with Alan Ackerman. New York: Palgrave Macmillan.
2003: Six Plays by Henrik Ibsen, with an introduction and notes by Martin Puchner. New York: Barnes and Noble.
2005: Karl Marx: The Communist Manifesto and Other Writings. With an introduction and notes by Martin Puchner. New York: Barnes and Noble.
2006: Theaterfeinde: Die anti-theatralischen Dramatiker der Moderne. Translated by Jan Kuveler. Freiburg: Rombach.
2006: Poetry of the Revolution: Marx, Manifestos, and the Avant-Gardes. Princeton: Princeton University Press, Winner of the James Russell Lowell Award.
2007: Modern Drama: Critical Concepts. New York: Routledge 
2009: The Norton Anthology of Drama. Co-editor. New York: Norton.
2010: The Drama of Ideas: Platonic Provocations in Theater and Philosophy. New York: Oxford University Press. Winner of the 2012 Joe A. Callaway Prize for best book in drama or theater.
2012: "The Norton Anthology of World Literature, 3rd edition." General editor. New York: Norton.
2017: "The Written World: The Power of Stories to Shape People, History, Civilization. New York: Random House, 2017.
2020: The Language of Thieves. New York: Norton.
2022: Literature for a Changing Planet. Princeton: Princeton University Press.
2023: ''Culture: The Story of Us, from Cave Art to K-pop. New York: Norton.

References

External links
 Private homepage
 Page at harvard.edu

German literary critics
Living people
20th-century German philosophers
University of Bologna alumni
Harvard University alumni
Year of birth missing (living people)
Place of birth missing (living people)
21st-century German philosophers
University of Konstanz alumni
Harvard Extension School faculty